The canton of Saint-Vit is an administrative division of the Doubs department, eastern France. It was created at the French canton reorganisation which came into effect in March 2015. Its seat is in Saint-Vit.

It consists of the following communes:
 
Abbans-Dessous
Abbans-Dessus
Arc-et-Senans
Bartherans
Berthelange
Brères
Buffard
Burgille
By
Byans-sur-Doubs
Cessey
Charnay
Chay
Chenecey-Buillon
Chevigney-sur-l'Ognon
Chouzelot
Corcelles-Ferrières
Corcondray
Courcelles
Courchapon
Cussey-sur-Lison
Échay
Émagny
Épeugney
Étrabonne
Ferrières-les-Bois
Fourg
Franey
Goux-sous-Landet
Jallerange
Lantenne-Vertière
Lavans-Quingey
Lavernay
Liesle
Lombard
Mercey-le-Grand
Mesmay
Moncley
Montrond-le-Château
Le Moutherot
Myon
Palantine
Paroy
Pessans
Placey
Pouilley-Français
Quingey
Recologne
Rennes-sur-Loue
Ronchaux
Roset-Fluans
Rouhe
Ruffey-le-Château
Rurey
Saint-Vit
Samson
Sauvagney
Le Val
Velesmes-Essarts
Villars-Saint-Georges
Villers-Buzon

References

Cantons of Doubs